The Battle of Desna, also known as the Crossing of the Desna River, was a three-day operation which took place on 11 to 13 November 1708 during the Swedish invasion of Russia in the Great Northern War. The Swedes under Charles XII tried to prevent the Russians from seizing the town of Baturyn, by crossing the river of Desna which was strongly defended by a Russian army of 4,000 men under Ludwig Nicolaus von Hallart. On 11 November the Swedes attempted to build a bridge going over the river, however, the heavy fire from the Russians made for slow progress and so, on 12 November, Berndt Otto Stackelberg with 600 men crossed the river on rafts to cover the ongoing construction of the bridge. The Russians counterattacked but were fiercely repulsed by the outnumbered Swedish defenders. The Russians retreated on 13 November leaving about 356 men dead while having another 1,000 wounded. The crossing had been successful and was often compared to Alexander the Great's crossing of the Granicus. However, the Swedes were too late to defend Baturyn and the city had already been destroyed in the Sack of Baturyn.

References

Desna
1708 in Europe
Desna
Desna
Desna
Charles XII of Sweden